Peperomia variilimba is a species of perennial herb and epiphyte from the genus 'Peperomia'. It grows in wet tropical biomes. It was discovered by Guido Mathieu in 2020. the concept of Peperomia variilimba has been confusing for almost a century due to an inaccurate description of its leaf position.

Etymology
variilimba is an epithet that refers to the various leaves, as well as succulence.

Distribution
Peperomia variilimba is native to Madagascar. Specimens can be found at an altitude of 1000-2000 meters. It is known in eleven locations. It is known in eleven locations.

Madagascar
Alaotra-Mangoro
Toamasina
Zahamena
Boeny
Mahajanga
Diana
Antsiranana
Ambatohafo valley

Description
It is a perennial herb and epiphyte that can be found on mossy trunks. It has a slender stem.

References

variilimba
Flora of Africa
Flora of Madagascar
Plants described in 2020